The Secret Knowledge (2013) is the seventh novel by Scottish writer Andrew Crumey. it is his first since returning to his original UK publisher Dedalus Books, and was awarded a grant by the Arts and Humanities Research Council. Part of the writing was done while the author was visiting fellow at the Institute of Advanced Study.

Synopsis
In 1913, composer Pierre Klauer envisages marriage to his sweetheart and fame for his new work, The Secret Knowledge. Then tragedy strikes. A century later, concert pianist David Conroy hopes the rediscovered score might revive his own flagging career. Music, history, politics and philosophy become intertwined in a multi-layered story that spans a century. Revolutionary agitators, Holocaust refugees and sixties’ student protesters are counterpointed with artists and entrepreneurs in our own age of austerity. All play their part in revealing the shocking truth that Conroy must finally face – the real meaning of The Secret Knowledge.

Themes
The novel is, in part, concerned with the concepts of the multiverse and quantum suicide, which have featured in previous novels by Crumey, and in articles and conference talks. Specific reference is made to the anarchist Louis-Auguste Blanqui, and the philosophers Walter Benjamin and Theodor Adorno, both of whom appear as characters in the novel. Reference is made to motifs from Crumey's earlier novels, particularly the Rosier Corporation which appeared in Mobius Dick. The missing wife of pianist David Conroy (called Laura) appears to be the same character of that name, who appeared in Mobius Dick.

References

External links 
 Guardian review
 Other press reviews (publisher website)
 Goodreads.com

Novels by Andrew Crumey
2013 British novels